The BMW New Class was a line of sedans and coupes produced by German automaker BMW between 1962 and 1977. These models ensured BMW's solvency after the company's financial crisis of the 1950s and established the identity of BMW automobiles as sports sedans.

The first New Class vehicle was the 1500, a 4-door compact executive car with the new M10 (at the time called M115) OHC 4-cylinder engine. In 1965, the 2000C and 2000CS luxury coupés were added to the range.

Replacement of the New Class models began with the larger 2000C and 2000CS coupés, which were replaced by the 6-cylinder E9 2800CS in 1969. In 1972, the 4-door sedans were replaced by the larger E12 5 Series.

The New Class coupes introduced the Hofmeister kink, which has been used on most BMW cars since. Another legacy of the New Class is the iconic 02 Series, which are a shortened version of the New Class sedans.

Overview

Background
During the 1950s, the BMW line-up consisted of luxury cars with displacements of two litres or greater, economy cars powered by motorcycle engines, and motorcycles. With their luxury cars becoming increasingly outdated and unprofitable and their motorcycles and economy cars becoming less attractive to an increasingly affluent society, BMW needed a car in the 1.5 to 2 litre class to become competitive.  Prototypes powered by a 1.6 L engine based on one bank of the BMW OHV V8 engine were built and evaluated without a convincing result.

In 1960, Herbert and Harald Quandt invested heavily in BMW, and gained a controlling interest in the company. That year, the "Neue Klasse" project was begun. Led overall by Fritz Fiedler, the project had Eberhard Wolff in charge of chassis design, Wilhelm Hofmeister in charge of styling and body engineering, and Alex von Falkenhausen in charge of engine design. The team was to produce a new car with a new engine, which BMW had not done since the 303 in 1933.

The prototype was introduced in September 1961 at the Frankfurt Motor Show as the BMW 1500 four-door saloon, alongside the BMW 3200 CS, the last BMW with the OHV V8.

The term New Class referred to the 1.5–2–liter class of automobiles from which BMW had been absent since World War II.

The car took over oncoming demand of the Borgward Isabella market, as Borgward disappeared the year before.

Chassis and body
The three-box four-door saloon was in many ways conventional, using a unitary structure and MacPherson strut front suspension which were becoming mainstream by the time of the 1500s introduction. Less conventional was the independent rear suspension, which featured coil springs and semi-trailing wishbones pivoted from a stout cross beam that also supported the differential housing. While BMW was using MacPherson struts for their first time on the New Class, they had used unit body construction on the 700 and semi-trailing arm rear suspension on the 600 and the 700. All New Class cars had front disc brakes.

Engines

The M10 overhead camshaft engine used in the New Class was required to displace 1.5 L initially, with the possibility to be expanded to 1.8 L.  Von Falkenhausen had earlier designed an engine prototype for possible use in the BMW 700 and used this as a starting point for the M10. The engine was canted over at 30 degrees to the right of vertical in order to allow for the low bonnet line, which also contributed to the styling of the car.

Financial results 

In the years preceding the New Class's 1962 release, BMW had recorded many operating losses. In 1962, the company broke even, with a turnover of 294 million marks. In 1963, sales increased by 47% to 433 million marks, and BMW was able to pay dividends to its shareholders for the first time in 20 years.

Production figures

New Class Sedans

1500

Introduced in September 1961 at the Frankfurt Motor Show, the BMW 1500 entered regular production in October 1962 and was manufactured until December 1964.

The M10 4-cylinder engine used oversquare dimensions of  bore and  stroke produced  in the BMW 1500.

Contemporary reports praised the all-round visibility and the commanding driving position while recording that it was necessary to lean forward a little to engage first and third gears due to the long travel distance of the gear lever. The large 40 cm tall luggage compartment was also commended.

The performance was at the time considered lively in light of the engine size, and although the engine needed to be worked hard in order to achieve rapid progress, it ran smoothly even at speeds above 6,000 rpm. The firm suspension and correspondingly harsh ride surprised those conditioned by the BMW 501 to anticipate a more comfort-oriented suspension setup.

Notable problems that developed with the 1500 included separation of the semi-trailing arm mounts from the body, rear axle failure, and gearbox problems.  These were resolved in later versions of the New Class sedan.

The 1500 was replaced in 1964 by the 1600, but it was still made available in markets where capacities greater than 1500 cc incurred higher tax rates.

1800

Introduced in September 1963, the BMW 1800 was the second member of the New Class family. This model had an M10 engine with an  bore and  stroke, giving a displacement of 1,773 cc.

The 1800 TI (Turismo Internazionale) model featured components developed for the 1800 by the tuning company Alpina.

A homologation special, the 1800 TI/SA, was introduced in 1964. The TI/SA's engine had dual Weber DCOE-45 carburetors and a 10.5:1 compression ratio. The TI/SA also had a Getrag five-speed gearbox, stronger anti-roll bars, and larger-diameter brake discs than the TI. 200 examples of the TI/SA were built and were only sold to licensed racing and sports drivers.

An automatic transmission option was introduced in 1966 and in 1967 the 1800 was generally updated along with the 2000. The updates included interior changes (a modernized dashboard design and simpler door panels) as well as styling changes to the front grilles.

In 1968 the 1,773 cc engine used in the 1800 was replaced by an engine with the  bore of the 2.0 L engine and the original  stroke, which resulted in a displacement of 1,766 cc and a stroke/bore ratio of 0.798:1 (compared with the previous 1800 engine's ratio of 0.952:1).

1600

The 1600 was produced until early 1971.

2000

The engines from the 2000C and 2000CS coupes were used in the 4-door sedan body for the 2000 and 2000TI models. The 2000 sedan, released in 1965, used the  engine from the 2000 C. The 2000TI sedan, released in 1966, used the   engine from the 2000 CS with twin Solex PHH side-draft carburetors.

Intended as an upscale version of the 1800, the 2000 featured distinct wide taillights, more exterior trim, and unique rectangular headlights.  The American market 2000 sedans could not have the rectangular headlights due to government regulations. A different grille with two individual round headlights, similar to the design that BMW later used in the 2500 sedan, was offered in the US. The 2000TI retained the '1800' taillights and headlights.  A more luxurious 2000TI-lux (later "tilux") featured the sporty TI engine with a more high-grade interior and accessories, including a wood dashboard and optional leather seats.

In a 1967 test, Road & Track felt that the 2000 sedan was "the best performing 2-liter sedan in today's market and the best handling and best riding as well."

In 1969, BMW introduced the 2000tii ('touring international, injected'), BMW's first fuel-injected model, featuring Kugelfischer mechanical fuel injection.

Production volumes
Note that not all models are included.

Special models
In 1972 BMW developed its first electric car based on the 1602 model. The BMW 1602 Elektro-Antrieb was first unveiled at the 1972 Olympic Games in Munich, Germany; two examples were used to shuttle VIPs and serve as support cars in various long-distance events like the marathon.

New Class Coupés

The BMW New Class coupé range, which comprised the BMW 2000 C and BMW 2000 CS, was a coupé body style built by Karmann for BMW from the summer of 1965 to 1969. In 1965, BMW ended production of their Bertone-bodied 3200 CS coupé, the last of their line of V8 powered luxury cars from the 1950s. BMW decided to continue with a coachbuilt coupé. Based on the New Class platform, the 2000 C and 2000 CS introduced the 2.0 L version of the M10 4-cylinder engine and replaced the 3200 CS as BMW's flagship model in 1965..  The New Class coupes were replaced by the E9 coupés, which were based on a stretched 2000CS chassis and use a 6-cylinder engine.

Technical
The New Class coupé was developed from the New Class sedans to showcase the 2.0 L version of the M10 engine used in the sedans. The coupé was built for BMW by Karmann in Rheine and available as the 2000C, with a single-carburettor engine delivering  at 5500 rpm, or as the 2000CS with a twin-carburettor engine delivering  at 5500 rpm. Both versions used a four speed manual transmission as standard, while the 2000C was available with a three speed automatic transmission as an optional extra.

Styling

The New Class coupé was introduced just after the 3200CS coupé was discontinued. The styling was based on the New Class sedan, with an all-new front end. The headlights were behind a glass fairing, and the grill consisted solely of a chromed BMW "double-kidney" at the centre of the front.  Apart from chrome accents around the headlights and along the top of the front end, the rest of the front was painted metal, with a row of vertical slots behind the bumper on each side to admit air for cooling and engine induction. Reactions to the front end styling have been mixed; Norbye describes it as "a blunt, unattractive front end", Severson agrees, calling the front clip "odd-looking" and stating that the details of the front end "do no favors for the looks", while Noakes disagrees, referring to its "imposing front end" being "tidier than the Bertone body's fussy nose" in comparison to the 3200CS.

Production
Of the 13,691 New Class coupés built between 1965 and the end of production in mid-1969, 9,999 were twin carburettor 2000 CS coupés, 3,249 were single carburettor 2000 C coupés with automatic transmission, and 443 were 2000 C coupés with manual transmission.

Replacement

In 1968, the New Class coupés were replaced by the six-cylinder New Six CS (E9) models, which have a longer wheelbase and longer front clip to accommodate the M30 engine.  The front end styling was also modified to resemble that of the New Six (E3) sedans.

At the Paris Motor Show in 1968, BMW displayed a concept vehicle called the 2000ti Coupe, a coupe designed by Pietro Frua of the Glas car company (which BMW had taken over two years earlier). The 2000ti did not reach production.

02 Series 

The "02 Series" range of two-door sedans, coupes and convertibles began production in 1966, and was based on a shortened version of the New Class Sedan platform.

Motorsport
 A BMW 1800Ti/SA won the 1965 Spa 24 Hours touring car race.
 A BMW 2000ti won the 1966 Spa 24 Hours touring car race.
 Hubert Hahne won the 1966 European Touring Car Challenge (Division 3) driving a BMW 2000TI.

References

Further reading

External links

New Class
Compact executive cars
Sports sedans
1970s cars
Coupés
Cars introduced in 1961
Rear-wheel-drive vehicles
New Class